The Protocol Relating to the Status of Refugees is a key treaty in international refugee law. It entered into force on 4 October 1967, and 146 countries are parties.

The 1951 United Nations Convention Relating to the Status of Refugees restricted refugee status to those whose circumstances had come about "as a result of events occurring before 1 January 1951", as well as giving states party to the convention the option of interpreting this as "events occurring in Europe" or "events occurring in Europe or elsewhere".

The 1967 Protocol removed both the temporal and geographic restrictions. This was needed in the historical context of refugee flows resulting from decolonisation. Madagascar and Saint Kitts and Nevis are parties only to the convention, while Cape Verde, the United States of America and Venezuela are parties only to the protocol.

The protocol gave those states which had previously ratified the 1951 Convention and chosen to use the definition restricted to Europe the option to retain that restriction. Only four states actually chose that restriction: the Republic of the Congo, Madagascar, Monaco, and Turkey. Congo and Monaco dropped the restriction upon ratifying the 1967 Protocol; Turkey retained it, and Madagascar has not ratified the protocol.

There exists a diversity of definition of refugees across the globe, where countries and local districts even have differing legal meanings and rights allocated to refugees.

References

External links
 Introductory note by Guy S. Goodwin-Gill, procedural history note and audiovisual material on the Convention relating to the Status of Refugees and the Protocol relating to the Status of Refugees in the Historic Archives of the United Nations Audiovisual Library of International Law
 Lectures by Guy S. Goodwin-Gill entitled International Migration Law  – A General Introduction and Forced Migration – The Evolution of International Refugee Law and Organization in the Lecture Series of the United Nations Audiovisual Library of International Law
 Ratifications
 Protocol Relating to the Status of Refugees of 31 January 1967 – English text

Protocol
Human rights instruments
United Nations treaties
Protocol Relating to the Status of Refugees
Protocol Relating to the Status of Refugees
Treaties of Afghanistan
Treaties of Albania
Treaties of Algeria
Treaties of the People's Republic of Angola
Treaties of Antigua and Barbuda
Treaties of Argentina
Treaties of Armenia
Treaties of Australia
Treaties of Austria
Treaties of Azerbaijan
Treaties of the Bahamas
Treaties of Belarus
Treaties of Belgium
Treaties of Belize
Treaties of the Republic of Dahomey
Treaties of Bolivia
Treaties of Bosnia and Herzegovina
Treaties of Botswana
Treaties of the military dictatorship in Brazil
Treaties of Bulgaria
Treaties of Burkina Faso
Treaties of Burundi
Treaties of the State of Cambodia
Treaties of Cameroon
Treaties of Canada
Treaties of the Central African Republic
Treaties of Chad
Treaties of Chile
Treaties of the People's Republic of China
Treaties of Colombia
Treaties of the Republic of the Congo
Treaties of Costa Rica
Treaties of Ivory Coast
Treaties of Croatia
Treaties of Cyprus
Treaties of Czechoslovakia
Treaties of the Czech Republic
Treaties of Zaire
Treaties of Denmark
Treaties of Djibouti
Treaties of Dominica
Treaties of the Dominican Republic
Treaties of Ecuador
Treaties of Egypt
Treaties of El Salvador
Treaties of Equatorial Guinea
Treaties of Estonia
Treaties of the Ethiopian Empire
Treaties of Fiji
Treaties of Finland
Treaties of France
Treaties of Gabon
Treaties of the Gambia
Treaties of Georgia (country)
Treaties of West Germany
Treaties of East Germany
Treaties of Ghana
Treaties of the Kingdom of Greece
Treaties of Guatemala
Treaties of Guinea
Treaties of Guinea-Bissau
Treaties of Haiti
Treaties of the Holy See
Treaties of Honduras
Treaties of the Hungarian People's Republic
Treaties of Iceland
Treaties of Pahlavi Iran
Treaties of Ireland
Treaties of Israel
Treaties of Italy
Treaties of Jamaica
Treaties of Japan
Treaties of Kazakhstan
Treaties of Kenya
Treaties of Kyrgyzstan
Treaties of Latvia
Treaties of Lesotho
Treaties of Liberia
Treaties of Liechtenstein
Treaties of Lithuania
Treaties of Luxembourg
Treaties of Malawi
Treaties of Mali
Treaties of Malta
Treaties of Mauritania
Treaties of Mexico
Treaties of Monaco
Treaties of Montenegro
Treaties of Morocco
Treaties of the People's Republic of Mozambique
Treaties of Namibia
Treaties of Nauru
Treaties of the Netherlands
Treaties of New Zealand
Treaties of Nicaragua
Treaties of Niger
Treaties of Nigeria
Treaties of Norway
Treaties of Panama
Treaties of Papua New Guinea
Treaties of Paraguay
Treaties of Peru
Treaties of the Philippines
Treaties of Poland
Treaties of Portugal
Treaties of South Korea
Treaties of Moldova
Treaties of Romania
Treaties of Russia
Treaties of Rwanda
Treaties of Samoa
Treaties of São Tomé and Príncipe
Treaties of Senegal
Treaties of Serbia and Montenegro
Treaties of Yugoslavia
Treaties of Seychelles
Treaties of Sierra Leone
Treaties of Slovakia
Treaties of Slovenia
Treaties of the Solomon Islands
Treaties of the Somali Democratic Republic
Treaties of South Africa
Treaties of Spain
Treaties of Saint Kitts and Nevis
Treaties of Saint Vincent and the Grenadines
Treaties of the Democratic Republic of the Sudan
Treaties of Suriname
Treaties of Eswatini
Treaties of Sweden
Treaties of Switzerland
Treaties of Tajikistan
Treaties of North Macedonia
Treaties of East Timor
Treaties of Togo
Treaties of Trinidad and Tobago
Treaties of Tunisia
Treaties of Turkey
Treaties of Turkmenistan
Treaties of Tuvalu
Treaties of Uganda
Treaties of Ukraine
Treaties of the United Kingdom
Treaties of the United States
Treaties of Tanzania
Treaties of Uruguay
Treaties of Venezuela
Treaties of the Yemen Arab Republic
Treaties of Zambia
Treaties of Zimbabwe
1967 in New York City
Treaties adopted by United Nations General Assembly resolutions
Treaties extended to Montserrat
Treaties extended to Jersey
Treaties extended to Aruba
Treaties extended to the Caribbean Netherlands
Treaties extended to the Faroe Islands
Treaties extended to Greenland
Treaties extended to Portuguese Macau
Treaties extended to the Colony of the Bahamas
Treaties extended to British Saint Lucia
Treaties extended to Surinam (Dutch colony)
Treaties extended to West Berlin

sk:Newyorský protokol